The Wonderful Lips of Thibong Linh is a collection of adventure and fantasy short stories by Theodore Roscoe.  It was first published in 1981 by Donald M. Grant, Publisher, Inc. in an edition of 1,200 copies.  The stories originally appeared in the magazines Argosy and Adventure.

Contents
 Author's Note
 "On Account of a Woman"
 "The Squirrel and the Radical Face" 
 "The Voodoo Express"
 "The Wonderful Lips of Thibong Linh"
 Author's Postscript

References

1981 short story collections
Fantasy short story collections
Donald M. Grant, Publisher books